Elizabeth Jane Urbano Oineza (born July 22, 1996), better known as Jane Oineza, is a Filipino actress, commercial model and singer. A former child star of Goin' Bulilit, she gained local relativity on Pinoy Big Brother: All In. Oineza also received recognition for the Maalaala Mo Kaya episode "Manika", earning a New York Festivals' Best Actress nomination and an International Emmy nomination.

Life and career

1996–2001
Elizabeth Jane Urbano Oineza was born in the town of Bani, Pangasinan to Erwin Oineza, a businessman in Metro Manila, and his wife Jennifer Urbano. The oldest among three siblings, she lived with her family throughout the Ilocos region. Oineza is fluent in Tagalog and English, with some proficiency in Ilokano. She is of mostly Pangasinense and Ilocano ancestry. She is also Roman Catholic.

Scouted to join the entertainment industry at an early age, Oineza's first appearances on television began as a child model in over twenty TV commercials for various product brands.

From then on, Oineza became her family's sole breadwinner after her parents resigned from their respective jobs to assist her in her career. The family moved from the provinces to live in Pasig and then later in Quezon City.

"

2001–2012
Immediately upon release of a popular shampoo ad, a talent manager urged Oineza to venture into acting. She made her acting debut at the age of 5 in the primetime teleserye Sa Dulo ng Walang Hanggan (2001–2003). She then portrayed a child version of female protagonist in Sana'y Wala Nang Wakas (2003–2004) and Marina (2004) respectively. She soon came to prominence by joining the children's sketch comedy gag show Goin' Bulilit in various skits and parody roles. After graduating from Goin' Bulilit for three years, she was cast in the live-action fantasy series Kung Fu Kids (2008) as one of seven kids holding different personalities to be united by a prophecy. Kung Fu Kids earned a 37.1% national viewer rating according to NUTAM in the Philippines.

Since then, Oineza became a staple for local soap operas, appearing in supporting and guest roles in Ligaw na Bulaklak (2008), Maria la del Barrio (2011), Oka Tokat (2012), and in several episodes of the drama anthologies Maalaala Mo Kaya and Wansapanataym. In the midst of drama portrayals, she obtained more challenging roles. Oineza materialized on the big screen with her first indie short in Sampalataya for Philippine's 2009 Urban Mediamakers Film Festival Entry, playing the role of a blind girl who dreams in colors but sees everything in black and white. She returned to co-starring in Star Cinema-produced mainstream movies, namely Miss You Like Crazy (2010), I Do (2010), and Amorosa (2012). She also participated in the period indie, Bayaning Pepe, a film under the direction of Carlos Morales, encompassing a story traced back into the younger years of National Hero Jose Rizal. She received rave reviews from independent film critics as she played the infamous Leonor Rivera, Rizal's "lover by correspondence".

2013–2017
In 2013, Oineza gained international recognition for her performance in the drama anthology Maalaala Mo Kaya for the episode "Manika" (lit. Doll) aired in 2012. She earned a Finalist Certificate for Best Performance by an Actress at the New York Festivals, nominee for Outstanding Performance by an Actress in a Single Drama at the Golden Screen Awards, and Best Drama nomination at the International Emmy Awards. Oineza played the role Nene, a girl raped by her stepfather, witnesses her mother succumb to drug addiction and escapes to a convent. The "Manika" episode broke barriers as one of the most-talked about episodes in the Maalaala Mo Kaya anthology, reaching a 40% national viewer rating via Kantar Media/TNS.

Oineza was relaunched as part of Star Magic 2013. She was cast in a minor supporting role in Muling Buksan Ang Puso and a guest role in Juan dela Cruz. Separately, she appeared in another Maalaala Mo Kaya episode "Bimpo" where she played a young woman born with cerebral palsy. Her portrayal garnered her a second nod for Best Single Performance by an Actress at the 27th PMPC Star Awards for Television, alongside acclaimed veteran actress Nora Aunor.

In 2014, Oineza joined Pinoy Big Brother: All In as a celebrity housemate. She gained mixed attentions and viewer relevance because of her love-lines and strong personality. After 120 days, she was named 3rd Big Placer.

In 2015, she had her first lead role in the afternoon teleserye Nasaan Ka Nang Kailangan Kita, playing the role of Corrine, a determined daughter desires to fix her broken family.

Oineza was also featured in Sponge Cola's single "Move On", released locally and worldwide via iTunes. She then starred in several movies including The Love Affair (2015), Always Be My Maybe (2016), Bloody Crayons (2017), and Haunted Forest (2017).

2018–present
In 2018, Oineza cuts her hair short to play an antagonist role in the afternoon teleserye Araw Gabi. She then appeared in Los Bastardos, and also starred in the 2019 movies Finding You and Ang Henerasyong Sumuko Sa Love.

During the ABS-CBN shutdown and franchise crisis in the COVID-19 pandemic, Oineza starred in two teleserye projects for TV5: I Got You (2020) and Gen Z (2021). She then returned to ABS-CBN for the upcoming teleserye The Broken Marriage Vow (2021), playing a prominent and important role.

Filmography

Films

Television

Discography

Featured artist
 Various parodies on Goin' Bulilit (2005-2008)
 Pinoy Big Brother: All In originals - "Teen Love Song", "Turtle Song", "Bibimbap" (All In housemates, 2014)
 "Move On" (Sponge Cola, 2015)
 "Pag-ibig", "Walang Iba" (Nasaan Ka Nang Kailangan Kita (Songs from the Heart), 2015)
 Bato sa Buhangin (new cover version, duet with Morissette Amon, 2019)

Awards and nominations

Notes

External links
 
 
 Jane Oineza on Star Magic
 

1996 births
Living people
Filipino television actresses
Filipino film actresses
Filipino people of Spanish descent
Filipino Roman Catholics
People's Television Network
ABS-CBN personalities
Pinoy Big Brother contestants
TV5 (Philippine TV network) personalities
Actresses from Pangasinan
Singers from Pangasinan
Star Magic
21st-century Filipino singers
21st-century Filipino women singers